The Shadorma is a poetic form consisting of a six-line stanza (or sestet). It appears to be a form of recent invention and its origins are unknown.  The form is alleged to have originated in Spain.  Each stanza has a syllable count of three syllables in the first line, five syllables in the second line, three syllables in the third and fourth lines, seven syllables in the fifth line, and five syllables in the sixth line (3/5/3/3/7/5) for a total of 26 syllables.  A poem may consist of one stanza, or an unlimited number of stanzas (a series of shadormas).

The shadorma has been used by many modern writers and is a popular writing exercise in creative writing programs and workshops.

Spanish poetry
Literary terminology
Poetic forms